Aurora Zeka (born 2003) is a Swiss-Albanian singer.

Early life
Aurora Zeka was born on 2003 in Biel, Switzerland to Albanian parents.

Career
On July 30, 2018, Aurora released the video clip "Po Du".

In 2019, Aurora Zeka published the video clip "Tonight". The video was produced by Filmnation, while the audio production was performed by Zzap And Chriss. The text is written by a rapper of this label, Ensar Elshani, known by the artistic name, Fuego.

References

2003 births
Living people
21st-century Swiss women singers